The 1951 Marquette Hilltoppers football team was an American football team that represented Marquette University as an independent during the 1951 college football season. In its second season under head coach Lisle Blackbourn, the team compiled a 4–6–1 record and outscored opponents by a total of 223 to 213. The team played its home games at Marquette Stadium in Milwaukee.

Schedule

References

Marquette
Marquette Golden Avalanche football seasons
Marquette Hilltoppers football